Overkill is the first EP recorded by thrash metal band Overkill released in 1985 on Azra/Metal Storm records. It is also considered by the band as their "first album", making their debut Feel the Fire their second record and so forth. Released only on vinyl, the EP has been seen as a rare collector's item amongst Overkill fans, and all tracks are included on the !!!Fuck You!!! And Then Some compilation.

All of the songs from this EP (except for "The Answer") would be re-recorded for the band's future albums; "Rotten to the Core" and "Overkill" were re-recorded for Feel the Fire, while "Fatal If Swallowed" was re-recorded for Taking Over.

Track listing

Personnel
 Bobby "Blitz" Ellsworth – vocals
 Bobby Gustafson – guitars
 D.D. Verni – bass
 Rat Skates – drums

References

External links
 Official OVERKILL Site

1985 debut EPs
Overkill (band) albums
Thrash metal EPs